Six merchant ships have been named Vienna.

Vienna, a pre-1819 American sloop.
Vienna, a schooner built in 1866, Canadian.
Vienna, a schooner built in 1871, Official No. C950558.
, a bulk freighter built in 1873, Official No. US25875.
 a Great Eastern Railway ferry
, a London and North Eastern Railway passenger ship built in 1929 by John Brown & Company, Clydebank

References

Ship names